Narziveh (also Romanized as Narzīveh; also known as Narzebū) is a village in Oshnavieh-ye Shomali Rural District, in the Central District of Oshnavieh County, West Azerbaijan Province, Iran. At the 2006 census, its population was 253, in 48 families.

References 

Populated places in Oshnavieh County